Streak is an American software company which is the developer of an eponymous customer relationship management platform for Gmail. The company also developed Secure Mail for Gmail, an open-source Google Chrome extension that allowed users to encrypt their Gmail messages.

History
Streak was founded in 2011 by Aleem Mawani, a former Google product manager, and Omar Ismail. It was accepted into Y Combinator's Summer 2011 class and graduated from the accelerator in early 2012. It has received $1.9 million in venture capital. The company held a soft launch of its platform in January 2012; it entered open beta in March of that year.

Product
Streak is a spreadsheet-style customer relationship management plug-in for Gmail that supports both Google Chrome and Safari web browsers. Users connect the plugin to their Google account via OpenID and do not share their login credentials with the program. Streak was released as an iOS application in August 2013. It added email read receipts to its platform in early 2014.

Sources

Software add-ons
Google Chrome extensions
Y Combinator companies